Paul Child may refer to:

Paul Child (singer) (born 1969), Welsh singer
Paul Child (actor) (born 1983), English actor
Paul Child (soccer) (born 1952), English former US soccer player
Paul Cushing Child, husband of chef, author and television personality Julia Child